Rolando Coimbra (born 25 February 1960) is a Bolivian footballer. He played in 15 matches for the Bolivia national football team from 1983 to 1987. He was also part of Bolivia's squad for the 1983 Copa América tournament.

References

1960 births
Living people
Association football defenders
Bolivian footballers
Bolivia international footballers
People from Obispo Santistevan Province